Kot is a hill station in the Swat District of Pakistan.  It is 4.4 km south of the town of Kalam on Route N-95, at an elevation of 2,034 m.

External links
 "Kot, Pakistan", Falling Rain Genomics, Inc. 
 "Kot Map — Satellite Images of Kot" Maplandia

Hill stations in Pakistan